Stream is the eighth album by Fischer-Z. The album contains the single "Protection", which explored the dark area of child exploitation. Following the album, John Watts concentrated on his solo career again, making this the last album by Fischer-Z, before its slight revival again in 2002.

Track listing

All songs written by John Watts except where noted.

"Jesus Give Me Back My Life"
"Dream Wedding"
"Protection"
"Big Man Buddha"
"Buffalo Heart"
"Stream of Unconscious"
"You Never Cross The Same River Twice" (John Watts, Pete Glenister)
"Magic Moon"
"No Strings"
"Goldrush Town"
"Here and Now"

Personnel
John Watts – vocals, guitars
Hadji Wazner – electric guitar
Peter Sinden ("Count Sinden von Sinden") – bass
Chuck Sabo – drums, percussion

Additional musicians
Simon Clark – keyboards
Pete Glenister – guitar
Ingrid Glenister – backing vocals
Alison Jiaer – backing vocals
Iren, Lucie, Emillie & Leila Watts – backing vocals

Additional personnel
Jon Gray, Philip Tennant – Recording engineers
Pete Glenister, Victor van Vugt – Mixing
Tim Young – Mastering
Neil Butler – Art director
Perry King – Photography
Quentin King – Designer

References

1995 albums
Fischer-Z albums